Gordon Waite Underwood  (June 3, 1910 – January 15, 1978) was a United States Navy captain who was awarded the Navy Cross for his achievements during World War II. He is the namesake of the ship .

Early life
Gordon Underwood was born in New York on June 3, 1910, and at an early age moved with his family to Portland, Oregon. In 1932, he was appointed to the United States Naval Academy. At the Naval Academy he proved to be an outstanding student and superb athlete. He earned letters and starred in football and track. He was awarded the coveted Naval Academy Sword for athletic excellence.

Naval career
This tour was followed by training at the United States Submarine School in New London, Connecticut. In 1941, he attended Massachusetts Institute of Technology and earned a master's degree in Marine Engineering.

Returning to sea duty, Underwood was assigned to the Staff of Commander Submarine Squadron Ten as Squadron Engineer supporting submarines on war patrol. On this ship during three war patrols he was credited with destruction of 76,000 tons of enemy shipping, including the aircraft carrier Shinyo. For each of his war patrols he was awarded a Navy Cross and in recognition of the great successes of the first two patrols Spadefish was awarded the Presidential Unit Citation.

Underwood's record of success in his war patrols remains one of the most notable in the history of the United States Navy Submarine Service.

Corporate career
Captain Underwood retired from the navy in 1962 after 30 years of distinguished service. After retirement, he became Vice President of Spelin Inc., Mountain View, California. He was also Vice President of Filter-Aire of Hollister, California until his retirement.

Awards & Decorations

References
A portion of this text originated from the public domain ship's history of USS Underwood .

1910 births
1978 deaths
Recipients of the Navy Cross (United States)
United States Navy officers
United States Navy personnel of World War II
United States submarine commanders